Gullveig is a female figure in Norse mythology associated with the legendary conflict between the Æsir and Vanir. In the poem Völuspá, she came to the hall of Odin (Hár) where she is speared by the Æsir, burnt three times, and yet thrice reborn. Upon her third rebirth, she began practicing seiðr and took the name Heiðr.

Gullveig/Heiðr is solely attested in the Poetic Edda, compiled in the 13th century from earlier traditional material. Scholars have variously proposed that Gullveig/Heiðr is the same figure as the goddess Freyja, that Gullveig's death may have been connected to corruption by way of gold among the Æsir, and/or that Gullveig's treatment by the Æsir may have led to the Æsir–Vanir War.

Etymology
The etymology of the Old Norse name Gullveig remains uncertain. It is a compound formed with the Old Norse word for 'gold' (gull), yet the second element–found in other personal names like Rannveig, Sölveig, or Thórveig–remains obscure. It could have meant  'power, strength' (cf. Icelandic veig, Faroese veiggj), 'intoxicating drink' (cf. Norwegian veigja), possibly 'lady' (cf. Norw. veiga) or even 'gold, gold thread' (cf. Old English wāg, Old Saxon wēg). The name has been variously translated as 'Gold-drink', 'Gold-drunk', or as 'Gold-draught'. Gullveig is sometimes held to be a personification of gold itself, purified through repeated smelting.

The name Heiðr, which in adjectival form means 'bright, clear', is semantically related. Scholar Rudolf Simek comments that although Gullveig's name changes to Heiðr, the meaning still remains basically the same.

Attestations
Gullveig is solely attested in a stanza of Völuspá (Prophecy of the Völva) immediately preceding the story of the Æsir–Vanir War. A völva (seeress) recalls that Gullveig was pierced by spears before being burnt three times in the hall of Hárr (one of Odin's names), and yet was three times reborn. Presumably after her burning, Gullveig became known as Heiðr, a knowledgeable völva who could perform great feats:

Theories
Starting with scholar Gabriel Turville-Petre, many scholars such as Rudolf Simek and John Lindow have theorized that Gullveig/Heiðr is the same figure as Freyja. Lindow notes that "since Ynglinga saga says that Freyja first brought seid to the æsir, it is not impossible that Gullveig is Freyja, and that she brought seid to the æsir in the first instance either as a strategy in the war, or that her bringing of seid started the war." Orchard further mentions that Freyja, like Gullveig, is associated with gold and with the form of magic known as seid.

See also
List of names of Freyja, a list of various names attributed to the goddess Freyja

Notes

References

 Bellows, Henry Adams (1923). The Poetic Edda. American-Scandinavian Foundation.
 
 
 
 Thorpe, Benjamin (Trans) (1907). Edda Sæmundar Hinns Frôða The Edda of Sæmund the Learned. Part I. London Trübner & Co.
 

Female supernatural figures in Norse mythology
Freyja
Vanir
Witchcraft in folklore and mythology